The transactional interpretation of quantum mechanics (TIQM) takes the wave function of the standard quantum formalism, and its complex conjugate, to be retarded (forward in time) and advanced (backward in time) waves that form a quantum interaction as a Wheeler–Feynman handshake or transaction. It was first proposed in 1986 by John G. Cramer, who argues that it helps in developing intuition for quantum processes. He also suggests that it avoids the philosophical problems with the Copenhagen interpretation and the role of the observer, and also resolves various quantum paradoxes. TIQM formed a minor plot point in his science fiction novel Einstein's Bridge.

More recently, he has also argued TIQM to be consistent with the Afshar experiment, while claiming that the Copenhagen interpretation and the many-worlds interpretation are not.

The existence of both advanced and retarded waves as admissible solutions to Maxwell's equations was explored in the Wheeler–Feynman absorber theory. Cramer revived their idea of two waves for his transactional interpretation of quantum theory. While the ordinary Schrödinger equation does not admit advanced solutions, its relativistic version does, and these advanced solutions are the ones used by TIQM.

In TIQM, the source emits a usual (retarded) wave forward in time, but it also emits an advanced wave backward in time; furthermore, the receiver, who is later in time, also emits an advanced wave backward in time and a retarded wave forward in time. A quantum event occurs when a "handshake" exchange of advanced and retarded waves triggers the formation of a transaction in which energy, momentum, angular momentum, etc. are transferred.  The quantum mechanism behind transaction formation has been demonstrated explicitly for the case of a photon transfer between atoms in Sect. 5.4 of Carver Mead's book Collective Electrodynamics. In this interpretation, the collapse of the wavefunction does not happen at any specific point in time, but is "atemporal" and occurs along the whole transaction, and the emission/absorption process is time-symmetric. The waves are seen as physically real, rather than a mere mathematical device to record the observer's knowledge as in some other interpretations of quantum mechanics. Philosopher and writer Ruth Kastner argues that the waves exist as possibilities outside of physical spacetime and that therefore it is necessary to accept such possibilities as part of reality.

Cramer has used TIQM in teaching quantum mechanics at the University of Washington in Seattle.

Advances over previous interpretations
TIQM is explicitly non-local and, as a consequence, logically consistent with counterfactual definiteness (CFD), the minimum realist assumption. As such it incorporates the non-locality demonstrated by the Bell test experiments and eliminates the observer-dependent reality that has been criticized as part of the Copenhagen interpretation. Cramer states that the key advances over Everett's Relative State Interpretation are that the transactional interpretation has a physical collapse and is time-symmetric. Cramer also states that the TI is consistent with but not dependent upon the notion of an Einsteinian block universe. Kastner claims that by considering the product of the advanced and retarded wavefunctions, the Born rule can be explained ontologically.

The transactional interpretation is superficially similar to the two-state vector formalism (TSVF) which has its origin in work by Yakir Aharonov, Peter Bergmann and Joel Lebowitz of 1964. However, it has important differences—the TSVF is lacking the confirmation and therefore cannot provide a physical referent for the Born Rule (as TI does). Kastner has criticized some other time-symmetric interpretations, including TSVF, as making ontologically inconsistent claims.

Kastner has developed a new Relativistic Transactional Interpretation (RTI) also called Possibilist Transactional Interpretation (PTI) in which space-time itself emerges by a way of transactions. It has been argued that this relativistic transactional interpretation can provide the quantum dynamics for the causal sets program.

Debate
In 1996, Tim Maudlin proposed a thought experiment involving Wheeler's delayed choice experiment that is generally taken as a refutation of TIQM. However Kastner showed Maudlin's argument is not fatal for TIQM.

In his book, The Quantum Handshake, Cramer has added a hierarchy to the description of pseudo-time to deal with Maudlin's objection and has pointed out that some of Maudlin's arguments are based on the inappropriate application of Heisenberg's knowledge interpretation to the transactional description.

Transactional Interpretation faces criticisms. The following is partial list and some replies:

See also
 Retrocausality
 Quantum entanglement
 Quantum nonlocality
 Wheeler–Feynman absorber theory

References

Further reading
 John G. Cramer, The Quantum Handshake: Entanglement, Nonlocality and Transactions, Springer Verlag 2016, .
 Ruth E. Kastner, The Transactional Interpretation of Quantum Mechanics: The Reality of Possibility, Cambridge University Press, 2012.
 Ruth E. Kastner, Understanding Our Unseen Reality: Solving Quantum Riddles, Imperial College Press, 2015.
 Tim Maudlin, Quantum Non-Locality and Relativity, Blackwell Publishers 2002,  (discusses a gedanken experiment designed to refute the TIQM; this has been refuted in Kastner 2012, Chapter 5)
 Carver A. Mead, Collective Electrodynamics: Quantum Foundations of Electromagnetism, 2000, . 
 John Gribbin, Schrödinger's Kittens and the Search for Reality: solving the quantum mysteries has an overview of Cramer’s interpretation and says that “with any luck at all it will supersede the Copenhagen interpretation as the standard way of thinking about quantum physics for the next generation of scientists.”

External links
 John G. Cramer, Professor Emeritus of Physics at the University of Washington, presents "The Quantum Handshake Explored." YouTube video dated 1 Feb 2018.
 Pavel V. Kurakin, George G. Malinetskii, How bees can possibly explain quantum paradoxes, Automates Intelligents (February 2, 2005). (This paper tells about a work attempting to develop TIQM further)
 Kastner has also applied TIQM to other quantum mechanical issues in  "The Transactional Interpretation, Counterfactuals, and Weak Values in Quantum Theory" and  "The Quantum Liar Experiment in the Transactional Interpretation"

Interpretations of quantum mechanics
Quantum measurement
Quantum field theory
Theoretical physics